The Bulgarian Social Democratic Party (Balgarska Sotsialdemokraticheska Partiya, BSDP) is a social democratic political party in Bulgaria.

It was part of the Blue Coalition, an alliance led by the Union of Democratic Forces. At the legislative election in 2009, the alliance won 6.8% of the popular vote and 15 out of 240 seats. At the legislative election in 2021 the BSDP was part of the alliance Patriotic Coalition Volya–NFSB and the alliance won 2.33% of the popular vote and no seats.

External links
Official website

Social democratic parties in Bulgaria